Calliopiidae is a family of amphipods, containing the following genera:

Amphithopsis Boeck, 1861
Apherusa Walker, 1891
Bouvierella Chevreux, 1900
Calliopiella Schellenberg, 1925
Calliopiurus Bushueva, 1986
Calliopius Liljeborg, 1865
Cleippides Boeck, 1871
Frigora Ren in Ren & Huang, 1991
Halirages Boeck, 1871
Haliragoides G. O. Sars, 1895
Harpinioides Stebbing, 1888
Laothoes Boeck, 1871
Leptamphopus G. O. Sars, 1895
Lopyastis Thurston, 1974
Manerogeneia Barnard & Karaman, 1987
Membrilopus Barnard & Karaman, 1987
Metaleptamphopus Chevreux, 1911
Oligochinus J. L. Barnard, 1969
Oradarea Walker, 1903
Paracalliopiella Tzvetkova & Kudrjaschov, 1975
Pontogeneoides Nicholls, 1938
Stenopleura Stebbing, 1888
Stenopleuroides Birstein & M. Vinogradov, 1964
Tylosapis Thurston, 1974
Weyprechtia Stuxberg, 1880
Whangarusa Barnard & Karaman, 1987

References

Gammaridea
Taxa named by Georg Ossian Sars
Crustacean families